The Chartered Institution of Building Services Engineers (CIBSE; pronounced 'sib-see') is an international professional engineering association based in London, England that represents building services engineers. It is a full member of the Construction Industry Council, and is consulted by government on matters relating to construction, engineering and sustainability. It is also licensed by the Engineering Council to assess candidates for inclusion on its Register of Professional Engineers.

History
CIBSE was formed in 1976, and recived a Royal Charter that same year following a merger of the Institution of Heating and Ventilation Engineers (founded in 1897) and the Illuminating Engineering Society (founded in 1909). Previously CIBS, the word 'Engineers' was added in 1985, and hence the Institution became CIBSE.

Royal Charter
In accordance with the CIBSE Royal Charter and By-laws, the Institution's primary objects are:
 The promotion for the benefit of the public in general of the art, science and practice of such engineering services as are associated with the built environment and with industrial processes, such art, science and practice being hereinafter called "building services engineering".
 The advancement of education and research in building services engineering, and the publication of the useful results of such research.

CIBSE Regulations are informed by the Royal Charter and By-laws and cover matters relating to membership, election of the board, the chief executive, and regions and divisions.

Membership 
CIBSE has seven grades of membership, with the upper four granting postnominals:
Fellow (FCIBSE)
Member (MCIBSE)
Associate (ACIBSE)
Licentiate (LCIBSE)
Graduate
Student - full and part-time
Affiliate

Members assessed by CIBSE for professional registration may be granted the following postnominals by the Engineering Council:
 Chartered Engineer (CEng)
 Incorporated Engineer (IEng)
 Engineering Technician (EngTech)

Related bodies
Four societies and one institute exist within CIBSE to reflect special areas of expertise that exist within the field of building services:

Society of Facade Engineering (SFE) was set up in 2003 as a Society of CIBSE but with the support of the IStructE and RIBA. Its aim is to advance knowledge of and practice in facade engineering.
Society of Light and Lighting (SLL) acts as the professional body for lighting in the UK. It represents the interests of those involved in the art, science and engineering of light and lighting in their widest definition and has over 3,000 members in the UK and worldwide.
Society of Public Health Engineers (SoPHE) is to provide a higher profile and focus for public health engineers within CIBSE.
Institute of Local Exhaust Ventilation Engineers (ILEVE) was established in 2011 to promote air quality in the workplace and to reduce ill health and death due to airborne contamination and hazardous substances in the working environment.
Society of Digital Engineering (SDE) was formed to provide a home for those involved in digitising the built environment, either as designers, contractors, manufacturers, clients, facility managers or software vendors.
CIBSE Patrons are a group of businesses who collaborate to give financial, technical and  moral backing to a wide range of initiatives led by the Institution.

Groups

Various special interest groups operate within the Institution. These are free to join either as a member or non-member.

 ASHRAE
 Building Simulation
 Chimneys and Flues
 CHP & District Heating
 Daylight
 Electrical Services
 Energy Performance
 Young Energy Performance Group
 Facilities Management
 Healthcare
 Heritage
 Homes for the Future
 HVAC Systems
 Information Technology (IT) & Controls
 Intelligent Buildings
 Lifts
 Natural Ventilation
 Resilient Cities
 School Design

Networks
 Young Engineers Network (YEN)
 Women in Building Services Engineering (WiBSE)

Certification
In recent years there has been an increasing focus on sustainability and green design by the UK government. The implementation of Part L (Conservation of Fuel and Power) of the U.K. Building Regulations in 2006 led CIBSE to set up the Low Carbon Consultants Register to ensure that a body of competent and trained professionals was available to implement the various requirements of the regulations, specifically in undertaking the relevant calculations to demonstrate the required reduction in carbon emissions from buildings both in design and operation. Members of the Register must undertake specific training and examinations to demonstrate their competence in various aspects of the regulations.

The CIBSE scheme further offers accreditation as a Low Carbon Energy Assessor (LCEA), again subject to specific training and examinations, who are then able to provide the Energy Performance Certificates (EPCs) and Display Energy Certificates (DECs), as required under the Energy Performance in Buildings Regulations (EPB Regulations).  These certificates can only be provided by accredited energy assessors who are members of an approved scheme such as the Low Carbon Energy Assessors Register. Furthermore, assessors are required to update their training regularly to ensure that continued high standards of competency are met.

The LCC scheme has been expanded in recent years to include for the grade of Low Carbon Consultant: Energy Management Systems, these LCC's having been trained and tested by CIBSE to ensure they have the relevant competencies to assist organisations to implement BS EN 16001.

CIBSE also offers certification for Air Conditioning Inspectors, to perform inspections as required by the Energy Performance of Buildings (Certificates and Inspections) (England and Wales) Regulations 2007.

Training
Many training options are available through CIBSE, with the aim of providing specialised courses, conferences and seminars for those within the building services industry. and the provision of Continuing Professional Development (CPD) training, to improve and enhance the skills required to be engineering professional.  Included are a range of courses from fire safety and mechanical and electrical services courses, to facilities management and business skills-focused training. Online modules can also be completed which can be used to contribute towards the Edexcel Advanced Professional Diploma in Building Services Engineering.

Publications
CIBSE publishes several guides to building services design, which include for various recommended design criteria and standards, some of which are cited within the UK building regulations and therefore form a legislative requirement for major building services works. The main guides are:
 Guide A: Environmental design
 Guide B: Heating, ventilating, air conditioning and refrigeration
 Guide C: Reference data
 Guide D: Transportation systems in buildings
 Guide E: Fire safety engineering
 Guide F: Energy efficiency in buildings
 Guide G: Public health and plumbing engineering
 Guide H: Building control systems
 Guide J: Weather, solar and illuminance data (now withdrawn)
 Guide K: Electricity in buildings
 Guide L: Sustainability
 Guide M: Maintenance engineering and management
In November 2011 CIBSE made its full range of published guidance (including all the CIBSE Guides, CIBSE Commissioning Codes, Applications Manuals, Technical Memoranda, Lighting Guides) available for free to its members through the Knowledge Portal.

CIBSE publishes a monthly magazine, the CIBSE Journal (formerly the Building Services Journal). Two quarterly technical journals are published in association with Sage: Building Services Engineering Research & Technology (BSERT) is free online to all CIBSE members and Lighting Research & Technology Journal (LR&T) which is free for Society of Light and Lighting members only.

Past CIBSE presidents
Past presidents (2000–present) include:

David Wood CEng FCIBSE 2000
Max Fordham OBE CEng FCIBSE FREng 2001
Doug Oughton FREng FCIBSE 2002
Terry Wyatt FCIBSE 2003
Graham Manly CEng FCIBSE MInstR 2004
Donald Leeper 2005 OBE BSc(Hons) ARCS CEng FCIBSE FIMechE FRSA FConsE
Eur Ing David Hughes CEng FCIBSE 2006
John Armstrong MPhil CEng FCIBSE MIMechE MBIFM 2007
Professor John Swaffield FRSE FCIBSE 2008
Mike Simpson BSc CEng FCIBSE FSLL FILE FIET 2009
Rob Manning CEng FCIBSE 2010
Andy Ford CEng FCIBSE 2011
Professor David Fisk CB FRAEng FCIBSE FRIBA (Hons) FIoP 2012
George Adams CEng FCIBSE 2013
Peter Kinsella CEng FCIBSE 2014
Nick Mead CEng FCIBSE 2015
John Field CEng FCIBSE MEI CMVP 2016
Peter Y Wong CEng MCIBSE 2017
Stephen Lisk FCIBSE FSLL 2018
Lynne Jack CEng FCIBSE FSoPHE 2019
Stuart MacPherson PhD CEng FCIBSE 2020

The current CIBSE president, Kevin Kelly CEng FCIBSE FSLL, took office in May 2021. Kelly is Emeritus Professor at Technological University of Dublin. A past president of the Society of Light and Lighting (2013/14) and past chairman of CIBSE Ireland (2005/6), he is editor of the SDAR Journal, on the editorial board of Lighting Research & Technology and supervises PhD research in lighting.

See also 
 American Society of Heating, Refrigerating and Air-Conditioning Engineers
 Building engineer
 Society of Engineers
 Society of Professional Engineers UK

References

External links
Chartered Institution of Building Services Engineers (CIBSE)
CIBSE Journal – The official magazine of CIBSE
The American Society of Heating, Refrigerating and Air- Conditioning Engineers (ASHRAE)
The Building Services Research and Information Association (BSRIA) BSRIA

Building engineering organizations
Heating, ventilation, and air conditioning
Engineering societies based in the United Kingdom
Building Services Engineers
ECUK Licensed Members
1976 establishments in the United Kingdom
Organizations established in 1976
International professional associations
Lighting organizations